HelpUsGreen is a social enterprise based out of Kanpur, India founded in 2015 that preserves the Ganges by flowercycling the waste from the places of worship and converts them into patented lifestyle products with the help of rural women enabling circular economy. The company was founded in 2015 by Karan Rastogi and Ankit Agarwal. In 2019, the founders split mutually and formed 2 individual companies. Help Us Green LLP is owned by Mr. Karan Rastogi.

Work
The company collects 2.4 tons of floral waste from temples and mosques in Uttar Pradesh, India on a daily basis recycles these floral wastes into charcoal-free and bambooless incense, that helps in managing the floral refuse in the river and also helping in reviving The Ganges. HelpUsGreen is also in the process of developing methods of converting the waste flowers to bio-ethanol.

Awards 
List of Awards:
 United Nations Young Leader for sustainable Developmental Goals 2018
 United Nations Momentum of Change Award, Poland 2018
 Fast company world changing Ideas 2018
 Forbes 30 under 30 2018
 Unilever Young Entrepreneur award 2017
 TiE UP Entrepreneur of the year 2017
 TiE Global Spirit for of Manufacturing for Social Impact 2016
 UNEP Young champions of Earth 2017 (Asia-Pacific)
 Gifted Citizen 2017 by Ciudad le das Ideas Mexico 2017
 DBS NUS Social enterprise winner 2017
 Wharton India Economic Forum People's Choice Award 2017
 Winner of the Tata Social Enterprise challenge 2016
 ISB iDiya challenge 2015
 IIM Indore Kalpvriksha 2016,
 IIM Ahmadabad 2017 Masterplan
 IIT Kanpur UpStart Biz 2015
 Vilgro Unconvention New Delhi 2016
 IIT Kharagpur Empressario 2017

References

External links 

Official website
Restoring Sanctity for 1.25 Billion People|Karan Rastogi|TEDxLBSIM
EcoGuardians: Here’s How Karan Rastogi Is Filtering Out Religious Waste to Keep River Ganga Clean

Recycling industry